Yadier is a masculine given name. It has Hebrew origins where it means "friend or companion". It is a Spanish-language name, popular in Cuba and Puerto Rico.

People with the name
 Yadier Álvarez (born 1996), Cuban baseball pitcher
 Yadier Molina (born 1982), Puerto Rican baseball catcher
 Yadier Pedroso (1986–2013), Cuban baseball pitcher
 Yadier Sánchez (born 1987), Cuban volleyball player

References

Masculine given names